Martin Damm and Cyril Suk were the defending champions and won in the final 6–2, 6–4 against Stefan Koubek and Andy Roddick.

Seeds

Draw

External links
 2004 Qatar Open Doubles Draw

2004 Qatar Open
Doubles
Qatar Open (tennis)